The Office of the Auditor-General of Kenya is an Independent Office established under §229 of the Constitution of Kenya to audit Government Bodies and report on their management of allocated funds. The current Auditor-General is Nancy Gathungu.

Roles
The Auditor-General's roles under the Kenyan constitution are:
 Within six months after the end of each financial year, the Auditor-General shall audit and report, in respect of that financial
year, on:
 Accounts of the national and county governments
 Accounts of all funds and authorities of the national and county governments;
 Accounts of all courts
 Accounts of every commission and independent office established by the Constitution
 the accounts of the National Assembly, the Senate and the county assemblies
 Accounts of political parties funded from public funds;
 The public debt
 Accounts of any other entity that legislation requires the Auditor-General to audit.
 The Auditor-General may audit and report on the accounts of any entity that is funded from public funds.

Reports
The Auditor-General is mandated to do the following through the audit reports:
 An audit report shall confirm whether or not public money has been applied lawfully and in an effective way.
 Audit reports shall be submitted to Parliament or the relevant county assembly
 Within three months after receiving an audit report, Parliament or the county assembly shall debate and consider the report and take appropriate action.

Auditors-General 
 June 2020 - to present: Nancy Gathungu
August 2019 - to June 2020: office vacant 
 August 2011 - August 2019: Mr. Edward R. O. Ouko

References

External links 

Politics of Kenya
Government agencies of Kenya
2012 in Kenya
Law of Kenya
Kenya articles by importance
Government audit officials
Supreme audit institutions